Matt Loen is an American ice hockey coach and former player who was the NCAA Division III coach of the year.

Career
Loen began attending the University of Wisconsin–Eau Claire in 1991 and joined the ice hockey program. After his freshman campaign, he became one of the top scorers for the Blugolds and led the team in scoring as a senior. His offensive exploits helped him earn a professional contract after graduating and he continued to produce in the minor leagues. A 100-point season in 1997 helped Loen earn a promotion to the top level of the minor leagues. While he wasn't able to score at the same rate, Loen ended up staying at the AAA level for half a season around the turn of the century. Afterwards, he returned to the lower level and finished his playing career in 2003.

A few years after hanging up his skates, Loen was back at his alma mater as an assistant coach. He spent two years in the position before replacing Luke Strand as head coach. Loen proved a stabilizing force behind the bench as the Blugolds posted solid if unspectacular results. In his sixth season, everything changed for the program. Wisconsin–Eau Claire won 20 games for the first time in program history and reached the NCAA Tournament for just the second time in 36 years. The Blugolds stunned tournament favorite St. Norbert in the quarterfinal round and marched on to capture the National Championship. Loen was named as the national coach of the year for the stunning turnaround.

The following year, Wisconsin–Eau Claire was a founding member of the WIAC's ice hockey division. Despite playing a tougher schedule, the Blugolds continued to perform well under Loen and recorded at least 15 wins in each of the next seven seasons. Despite a pair of conference titles, UWEC was unable to return to the national tournament until 2020. Unfortunately, the entire championship was cancelled before a game could be played due to the COVID-19 pandemic. Loen helped the team trough the difficulties that followed and the Blugolds won another league title in 2022.

Statistics

Regular season and playoffs

Head coaching record

References

External links

1972 births
American ice hockey coaches
American men's ice hockey players
Living people
Ice hockey people from Minnesota
People from Coon Rapids, Minnesota
Madison Monsters players
Milwaukee Admirals players
Cincinnati Mighty Ducks players
Kalamazoo Wings (UHL) players
Tacoma Sabercats players
Rockford IceHogs (UHL) players
University of Wisconsin–Eau Claire alumni
University of Wisconsin–Eau Claire faculty